La cigüeña distraída is a 1966 Mexican comedy film directed by Emilio Gómez Muriel and starring the double act Viruta y Capulina, performed by Marco Antonio Campos and Gaspar Henaine.

Plot

Two different women give birth to twin brothers in a hospital, and when they are discussing outside the hospital, the fathers (Viruta and Capulina), confuse their babies when they say goodbye one another. Some years after, one of the couples is a pair of rich and well educated brothers that are meant to be married to a couple of rich sisters, Alma and Maria Castillo, while the other couple of brothers, a poor but friendly unemployed guys, fall in love with Emilia and Rosita, the maids of the rich twin brothers. When the two couples meet, confusion is ensued in all sides. After several situations that almost break the compromise of all four couples, the girls realize about the problem and make amends with the boys.

Cast
Marco Antonio Campos as Viruta Palacios / Viruta Corrales 
Gaspar Henaine as Capulina Palacios / Capulina Corrales 
Alma Delia Fuentes as María Castillo
María Duval as Alma Castillo
Emily Cranz as Emilia
Rosa María Vázquez as Rosita
Antonio Henaine as Capulina, Jr.
Francisco Navarrete as Viruta, Jr.
Fannie Kauffman as Mrs. Palacios
Óscar Ortiz de Pinedo as Attorney Atenógeres Castillo
Arturo Castro as Attorney Arturo Castro 
Mary Ellen as Miss Offside
Antonio Raxel as Don Antonio
Mario García "Harapos" as The Short Thief
Pedro de Urdimalas as Jaime
Nathanael León as Bowler
Gloria Chávez as The First Midwife
Arturo Correa as Bermúdez
Rosa Carbajal as Doña Regina
Roy Fletcher as Journalist
Ramón Valdés as The Skinny Thief 
Evelyn Ortiz as Mrs. Corrales
Perla Walter as Bowler Woman
José Jasso as Mr. Cejudo (uncredited)
Armando Gutiérrez as Don Gelasio (uncredited)

External links

Mexican comedy films
1960s Mexican films